Nicolae may refer to:

 Nicolae (name), an Aromanian and Romanian name
 Nicolae (novel), a 1997 novel

See also

Nicolai (disambiguation)
Nicolao